Bosnians, citizens of Bosnia and Herzegovina or people who identify as Bosnians on an interethnic basis.

Bosnians may also refer to:

 Bosnian Bosniaks, people from Bosnia and Herzegovina who identify as ethnic Bosniaks (mostly Muslims)
 Bosnian Croats, people from Bosnia and Herzegovina who identify as ethnic Croats (mostly Catholic Christians)
 Bosnian Serbs, people from Bosnia and Herzegovina who identify as ethnic Serbs (mostly Eastern Orthodox Christians)

See also
 Name of Bosnia
 Bosnia and Herzegovina
 Bosnia (disambiguation)
 Bosnian (disambiguation)
 Bosniak (disambiguation)
 Bosniaks (disambiguation)